Specific dynamic action (SDA), also known as thermic effect of food (TEF) or dietary induced thermogenesis (DIT), is the amount of energy expenditure above the basal metabolic rate due to the cost of processing food for use and storage.  Heat production by brown adipose tissue which is activated after consumption of a meal is an additional component of dietary induced thermogenesis.  The thermic effect of food is one of the components of metabolism along with resting metabolic rate and the exercise component. A commonly used estimate of the thermic effect of food is about 10% of one's caloric intake, though the effect varies substantially for different food components. For example, dietary fat is very easy to process and has very little thermic effect, while protein is hard to process and has a much larger thermic effect.

Factors that affect the thermic effect of food
The thermic effect of food is increased by both aerobic training of sufficient duration and intensity or by anaerobic weight training. However, the increase is marginal, amounting to 7-8 calories per hour. The primary determinants of daily TEF are the total caloric content of the meals and the macronutrient composition of the meals ingested. Meal frequency has little to no effect on TEF; assuming total calorie intake for the days are equivalent.

Although some believe that TEF is reduced in obesity, discrepant results and inconsistent research methods have failed to validate such claims.

The mechanism of TEF is unknown.  TEF has been described as the energy used in the distribution of nutrients and metabolic processes in the liver, but a hepatectomized animal shows no signs of TEF and intravenous injection of amino acids results in an effect equal to that of oral ingestion of the same amino acids.

Types of foods
The thermic effect of food is the energy required for digestion, absorption, and disposal of ingested nutrients. Its magnitude depends on the composition of the food consumed:
 Carbohydrates: 5 to 15% of the energy consumed
 Protein: 20 to 30%
 Fats: at most 5 to 15%

Raw celery and grapefruit are often claimed to have negative caloric balance (requiring more energy to digest than recovered from the food), presumably because the thermic effect is greater than the caloric content due to the high fibre matrix that must be unraveled to access their carbohydrates. However, there has been no research carried out to test this hypothesis and a significant amount of the thermic effect depends on the insulin sensitivity of the individual, with more insulin-sensitive individuals having a significant effect while individuals with increasing resistance have negligible to zero effects.

The Functional Food Centre at Oxford Brookes University conducted a study into the effects of chilli and medium-chain triglycerides (MCT) on Diet Induced Thermogenesis (DIT).  They concluded that "adding chilli and MCT to meals increases DIT by over 50% which over time may accumulate to help induce weight loss and prevent weight gain or regain".

Australia's Human Nutrition conducted a study on the effect of meal content in lean women's diets on the thermic effect of food and found that the inclusion of an ingredient containing increased soluble fibre and amylose did not reduce spontaneous food intake but rather was associated with higher subsequent energy intakes despite its reduced glycaemic and insulinemic effects.

Measuring TEF
The thermic effect of food should be measured for a period of time greater than or equal to five hours.

The American Journal of Clinical Nutrition published that TEF lasts beyond six hours for the majority of people.

References

Further reading
 

Metabolism